Eucereon chalcodon is a moth of the subfamily Arctiinae. It was described by Herbert Druce in 1893. It is found in the Brazilian states of São Paulo and Rio de Janeiro.

References

 

chalcodon
Moths described in 1893